Michael Joseph Budds (June 11, 1947 – November 19, 2020) was an American musicologist, and longtime professor, at the University of Missouri in Columbia, Missouri. In addition to teaching, he wrote and edited a number of works, including a widely used textbook on American popular music. Also a philanthropist, he established the Budds Center for American Music Studies at the University of Missouri School of Music where he taught. He was the first musicologist inducted into the Missouri Music Hall of Fame. Budds taught at Missouri for 37 years, until his death on November 19, 2020.

Personal life
Budds was born in Pana, Illinois on June 11, 1947 to Leon “Buddsie” Budds and Helen Kramer Budds. He attended Knox College and obtained his PhD from the University of Iowa. Budds served in the U.S. Navy during the Vietnam War and began teaching at the University of Missouri in 1982. His home was in the East Campus Neighborhood of Columbia, Missouri. Budds was known for his devotion to the music of Ella Fitzgerald. He was buried at the Rosemond Cemetery in Pana, Illinois.

University of Missouri
Budds taught undergraduate and graduate courses in music biography, music appreciation, music history, and research. His class on music appreciation entitled Jazz, Pop, & Rock would become the most popular class offered at the University. His research efforts were devoted to the study of American music, African-American music, and music in Victorian England. He served as the Area Coordinator of the Musicology & Ethnomusicology Area within the School of Music up until his retirement. In 2019, he donated 4 million dollars to establish the Budds Center for American Music Studies in memory of his family, of which he was the only remaining member.

Honors
In 2000, Budds was named a William T Kemper Fellow for Excellence in Teaching at the University of Missouri and at the time of his retirement was a Curators’ Distinguished Teaching Professor Emeritus. In 2019, He was the recipient of the William H. Byler Distinguished Professor Award. Budds was inducted into the Missouri Music Hall of Fame in 2009; he was the first musicologist to be honored so. Budds was an honorary member of the music fraternity Phi Mu Alpha Sinfonia.

Works
Budds was a contributor to The New Grove Dictionary of American Music; The New Grove Dictionary of Jazz; Women & Music: A History; Bleep! Censoring Rock and Rap; and American National Biography. As a member of the College Music Society he served as editor of the series Monographs and Bibliographies in American Music. He also authored a number of works, including:

Rock Recall: Annotated Readings in American Popular Music from the Emergence of Rock and Roll to the Demise of the Woodstock Nation (1993)
Jazz in the Sixties (1978)
Jazz & the Germans: Essays on the Influence of "hot" American Idioms on the 20th-century German Music (2003)

200 Memorable Missouri Musical Moments: Commentary, Historical Photographs, & Video Clips

See also
Music of the United States
Ella Fitzgerald discography

References

External links
Biography
Michael J. Budds Worldcat
Announcement of the Budds Center for the Study of American Music

20th-century American musicologists
21st-century American musicologists
Writers from Illinois
People from Columbia, Missouri
Writers from Columbia, Missouri
University of Missouri faculty
University of Missouri School of Music faculty
University of Iowa alumni
Knox College (Illinois) alumni
20th-century American male writers
20th-century American non-fiction writers
21st-century American male writers
21st-century American non-fiction writers
American male non-fiction writers
American textbook writers
1947 births
2020 deaths